Woodbury County is a county located in the U.S. state of Iowa. As of the 2020 census, the population was 105,941, making it the sixth-most populous county in Iowa. The county seat is Sioux City.

Woodbury County is included in the Sioux City metropolitan area.

History
Originally established in 1851 as Wahkaw County, the Iowa Legislature in 1853 changed the name to Woodbury County in honor of Levi Woodbury (1789–1851), a senator and governor of New Hampshire who served as a Supreme Court justice from 1844 until his death.

The first county seat of Wahkaw County was the now-extinct village of Thompsonville; when the Legislature changed the county name to Woodbury, the new county seat became Sergeant's Bluff (now Sergeant Bluff). The county seat was moved to Sioux City in 1856.

The Winnebago Tribe of Nebraska (Ho-Chunk) owns reservation land in Woodbury County.

Geography
The county is on the western edge of Iowa, with its western border being the Missouri River.

It is the third-largest county by area in Iowa.

Major highways

 Interstate 29
 Interstate 129
 U.S. Highway 20
 U.S. Highway 75
 U.S. Highway 77
 Iowa Highway 12
 Iowa Highway 31
 Iowa Highway 140
 Iowa Highway 141
 Iowa Highway 175

Transit
 Sioux City Transit
 List of intercity bus stops in Iowa

Adjacent counties
Plymouth County (north)
Cherokee County (northeast)
Ida County (east)
Monona County (south)
Thurston County, Nebraska (southwest)
Dakota County, Nebraska (west)
Union County, South Dakota (northwest)

Demographics

2020 census
There were 42,701 housing units, of which 39,904 were occupied.

2010 census
There were 41,454 housing units, of which 39,052 were occupied.

2000 census

As of the census of 2000, there were 103,877 people, 39,151 households, and 26,426 families residing in the county. There were 41,394 housing units at an average density of 47 per square mile (18/km2). The racial makeup of the county was 87.48% White, 2.02% Black or African American, 1.69% Native American, 2.41% Asian, 0.04% Pacific Islander, 4.37% from other races, and 1.99% from two or more races. 9.11% of the population were Hispanic or Latino of any race.

Of the 39,151 households, 34.00% had children under the age of 18 living with them, 51.90% were married couples living together, 11.30% had a female householder with no husband present, and 32.50% were non-families. 26.60% of households were one person and 11.20% were one person aged 65 or older. The average household size was 2.58 and the average family size was 3.13.

The age distribution was 27.30% under the age of 18, 10.20% from 18 to 24, 28.30% from 25 to 44, 20.80% from 45 to 64, and 13.40% 65 or older. The median age was 34 years. For every 100 females, there were 96.10 males. For every 100 females age 18 and over, there were 92.80 males.

The median household income was $38,509 and the median family income was $46,499. Males had a median income of $31,664 versus $22,599 for females. The per capita income for the county was $18,771. About 7.20% of families and 10.30% of the population were below the poverty line, including 13.60% of those under age 18 and 7.40% of those age 65 or over.

Politics
For much of the second half of the 20th century, Woodbury County tilted Republican, albeit not as overwhelmingly as most of western Iowa. Between 1988 and 2012 Woodbury County was the quintessential swing county in Iowa. No candidate won it by more than 3.5% over that quarter-century. This was the only county in Iowa that Barack Obama won in 2012 that he failed to carry in 2008. However, in 2016, Woodbury County swung over dramatically to Donald Trump, who carried it by a 22 percent margin, the largest margin of victory since Lyndon Johnson's landslide election in 1964.

Communities

Cities

Anthon
Bronson
Correctionville
Cushing
Danbury
Hornick
Lawton
Luton
Moville
Oto
Pierson
Salix
Sergeant Bluff
Sioux City
Sloan
Smithland

Unincorporated communities
Climbing Hill (a census-designated place)
Discord
Holly Springs
Midway
Owego

Townships

 Arlington
 Banner
 Concord
 Floyd
 Grange
 Grant
 Kedron
 Lakeport
 Liberty
 Liston
 Little Sioux
 Miller
 Morgan
 Moville
 Oto
 Rock
 Rutland
 Sioux City
 Sloan
 Union
 West Fork
 Willow
 Wolf Creek
 Woodbury

Population ranking
The population ranking of the following table is based on the 2020 census of Woodbury County.

† county seat

See also

National Register of Historic Places listings in Woodbury County, Iowa

References

Further reading
Lensch, R.A. (2006). Soil survey of Woodbury County, Iowa. Washington, D.C.: U.S. Department of Agriculture, Natural Resources Conservation Service

External links

Woodbury County government's website

 
1851 establishments in Iowa
Sioux City metropolitan area
Iowa counties on the Missouri River
Populated places established in 1851